Congophiloscia is a genus of crustacean isopods, in the family Philosciidae.

References

Woodlice
Crustaceans described in 1950